The Drama Desk Award for Outstanding Revival of a Play is an annual award presented by Drama Desk in recognition of achievements in the theatre among Broadway, Off Broadway and Off-Off Broadway productions. The award was initially introduced in 1976 as Outstanding Revival and included musicals as well as plays.

Winners and nominees

1990s

2000s

2010s

2020s

See also
 Laurence Olivier Award for Best Revival
 Tony Award for Best Revival of a Play

References

External links
 Drama Desk official website

Play Revival